I. Grant Scott (May 3, 1897 – November 17, 1964) was an American politician who served in the New Jersey General Assembly from 1936 to 1937 and in the New Jersey Senate from 1937 to 1944. He also served as the Mayor of Cape May from 1941 to 1948.

He died of a heart attack on November 17, 1964, in Cape May, New Jersey at age 67.

References

1897 births
1964 deaths
Majority leaders of the New Jersey Senate
Mayors of places in New Jersey
Republican Party members of the New Jersey General Assembly
Republican Party New Jersey state senators
Presidents of the New Jersey Senate
People from Cape May, New Jersey
20th-century American politicians